Uchechukwu Iheadindu (born June 29, 1979)  is a Romanian professional basketball player who played for the Romanian national basketball team in the international competitions between 2005 and 2007. He is of Nigerian descent through his father.

References

External links
 Uchechukwu Iheadindu at eurobasket.com

1979 births
Living people
Power forwards (basketball)
Romanian men's basketball players
Basketball players from Bucharest
Romanian people of Nigerian descent
Small forwards